Skjern railway station is a railway station serving the town of Skjern in West Jutland, Denmark.

The station is located on the west Jutland longitudinal railway from Esbjerg to Struer and is the western terminus of the Skanderborg-Skjern railway line from Skanderborg to Skjern. It offers regional train services to Aarhus, Esbjerg, Herning and Holstebro. The train services are currently operated by the railway companies Arriva and Midtjyske Jernbaner.

History 
Skjern station was opened in 1875 with the opening of the Varde-Ringkøbing section of the west Jutland longitudinal railway from Esbjerg to Struer. In 1881, Skjern station also became the western terminus of the Herning-Skjern section of the Skanderborg-Skjern railway line.

Operations 
The train services are operated by Arriva and Midtjyske Jernbaner. The station offers direct regional train services to Aarhus, Esbjerg, Herning and Struer.

See also
 List of railway stations in Denmark

References

Citations

Bibliography

External links

 Banedanmark – government agency responsible for maintenance and traffic control of most of the Danish railway network
 DSB – largest Danish train operating company
 Arriva – British multinational public transport company operating bus and train services in Denmark
 Danske Jernbaner – website with information on railway history in Denmark

Railway stations opened in 1875
Railway stations in the Central Denmark Region
1875 establishments in Denmark
Railway stations in Denmark opened in the 19th century